The Aden-Abyan Islamic Army (AAIA) is an Islamist militant group based in southern Yemen, led by Zein al-Abideen al-Mehdar (also known as Abu El-Hassan El-Mohader). The group has been designated as a terrorist organization by Bahrain, Canada and the United Kingdom. The group is thought to have organized in southern Yemen in the mid 1990s, with members that include veterans from the Soviet war in Afghanistan. Their stated mission is to "promote jihad in the fight against secularism in Yemen and other Arab States; to establish  an Islamic government in Yemen".

History

The Aden Abyan Islamic Army has strong ties with the al-Qaeda network.

The group was formed sometime between mid-1990s as a loose guerrilla network of a few dozen men. Issued the first series of political and religious statements on Yemeni and world affairs.

The group,"Aden-Abyan was formed sometime in either 1996 or 1997 as a loose guerrilla network of a few dozen men—a mix of veterans of the Soviet-Afghan war and Islamists from various countries." In terms of the formation and background on the AAIA,The name “Aden-Abyan Islamic Army” is a right-wing terrorist organization that is composed of religious ultra-conservatives, mujahideen, and deposed aristocrats. Other supporters of the AAIA include Yemenis of Aden, Abyan and liberals, socialists, and social conservatives The groups stated goal is to "hoist the banner of al-Jihad, and fight secularism in Yemen and the Arab countries." These were seen through the series of political and religious statements on Yemeni and world affairs." "The name “Aden-Abyan Islamic Army” appeals to the right wing, but also to some extent echoes the frustrations of Yemenis from Aden, Abyan and elsewhere in the former South, including liberals and socialists as well as social conservatives."

Zein al-Abideen al-Mehdar was arrested on December 1998 for his role in the abduction of a group of tourists and the killing of four of them, he was incommunicado and he was denied to access to lawyers. He was executed on October 1999.

Claimed attacks
The Aden-Abyan took responsibility for the October 2002 bombing of a French oil tanker, which killed a crew member.

Many believe that this attack was connected to the USS Cole bombing in 2000. This was one of the attacks that this group is best known for. Some events that took place previously to this include the kidnapping in 1988, where 16 of Western tourists were held hostage, some of which were killed in a failed rescue attempt. In addition to this, the Aden Abyan Islamic Army also claimed "attacks on Yemeni socialists prior to the 1993 parliamentary elections" This group has continued to wreak havoc on the lives of people in Aden and throughout the west. One of these include the attack in October 2000, where two suicide bombers aligned with Aden Abyan to explode their boat along the USS Cole" This became a very important attack for the group because it gained a lot of recognition from people around the world being able to see what the groups intentions were.

Credibility

This group mostly teamed up with the al-Qaeda networks in order to take part in attacks, which gave them credibility as a terrorist organization.

This group is mostly known for their work with Al-Qaida, having assisted the group in various attacks on western enemies. Their work with al-Qaeda has brought credibility to the group by showing that they are capable of working with a group as large as AQ.Through their work with the large group, the Aden Abyan Islamic Army "received financial and material support from Al-Qaida leader Osama bin Laden (deceased) in exchange for its support for Al-Qaida’s agenda." This gave the group a sense of power, being given tangible and intangible support from al-Qaeda in exchange for help in their endeavors.

References

Islamist groups
Islamic organizations based in Yemen
Jihadist groups in Yemen
Organisations designated as terrorist by the United Kingdom
Organizations based in Asia designated as terrorist
Organizations designated as terrorist by Bahrain
Organizations designated as terrorist by Canada
Organizations of the Yemeni Crisis (2011–present)
Terrorism in Yemen